Isaac Korir (born 26 August 1990) is a Kenyan-born Bahraini long distance runner. He has competed in competitions such as the Arab Athletics Championships, Asian Games, IAAF World Half Marathon Championships and the IAAF World Cross Country Championships, before 2013 for Kenya and after that for Bahrain.

Career

2013
Korir's first major athletics competition was the 2013 Arab Athletics Championships. He performed well and came second place in the 10,000 metres with a time of 29:48.59 behind compatriot, Alemu Bekele who won the race with a time of 29:43.45.

2014
In 2014, Korir competed in two international competitions, the 2014 Asian Games and the 2014 IAAF World Half Marathon Championships. At the Asian Games Korir competed in the 10,000 meters, coming third in a time of 28:45.65. At the World Half Marathon Championships Korir performed the best on the Bahraini team coming 23 in a personal best time of 1:01:40. This time was only 16 seconds off the national record set in 2006 by Abdelhak Zakaria. Overall, 2014 was a successful year for Korir.

2015
In 2015, Korir competed in the 2015 IAAF World Cross Country Championships. He assisted the Bahraini team in coming 3rd in the Senior Men's race standings, placing 4 on the team and 18 overall in a time of 36:27.

2016
In 2016, Korir took part in the 2016 Summer Olympics, competing in the marathon event. However, he was unable to finish the event, resulting in a DNF.

Personal bests
Korir does not currently hold any Bahraini national records in athletics, despite his times being quite close to the current records.

Outdoor

Indoor

References

External links

1990 births
Living people
Bahraini male long-distance runners
Asian Games bronze medalists for Bahrain
Medalists at the 2014 Asian Games
Asian Games medalists in athletics (track and field)
Athletes (track and field) at the 2014 Asian Games